Sir Christopher Guise, 1st Baronet (died 1670), of Elmore Court in Gloucestershire, England, was a Member of Parliament for Gloucestershire in 1654.

Origins
Guise was the son of William Guise of Elmore by his wife Cecilia Dennis, a daughter of John Dennis of Pucklechurch in Gloucestershire.

Career
In 1654 Guise was elected a Member of Parliament for Gloucestershire in the First Protectorate Parliament. He was created a baronet "of Elmore" on 10 July 1661.

Marriages and children
Guise married firstly Elizabeth Washington, daughter of Sir Lawrence Washington of Garsden, Wiltshire. He married secondly Rachel Corsellis of a noble Italian family. He was succeeded by his son Sir John Guise, 2nd Baronet.

References

Year of birth missing
1670 deaths
English MPs 1654–1655
Politicians from Gloucestershire
Baronets in the Baronetage of England